The 2015 NCAA Division III Men's Soccer Championship was the 42nd annual single-elimination tournament to determine the national champion of NCAA Division III men's collegiate soccer in the United States. The semifinals and championship game were played at Swope Soccer Village in Kansas City, Missouri (the home field of Swope Park Rangers, the USL affiliate of MLS's Sporting Kansas City) from December 4–5, 2015 while the preceding rounds were played at various sites across the country during November 2015.

Qualification
All Division III men's soccer programs were eligible to qualify for the 61-team tournament field. 42 teams received automatic bids by winning their conference tournaments and an additional 19 teams earned at-large bids based on their regular season records.

Automatic qualifiers (42)

At-large qualifiers (19)

Tournament bracket

Amherst Sectional

Haverford Sectional

Loras Sectional

Kenyon Sectional

Division III College Cup

See also 
 NCAA Men's Soccer Championships (Division I, Division II)
 NCAA Women's Soccer Championships (Division I, Division II, Division III)

References

NCAA Division III Men's Championship
NCAA Division III Men's Soccer Championship
NCAA Division III Men's Soccer Championship
NCAA Division III Men's Soccer Championship